Municipal election for Kathmandu, capital of Nepal was held on May 14, 2017 for the position of Mayor, a Deputy Mayor, 32 Ward Chairmen and Ward Members. All positions are for a period of 5 years.
A secondary election is to be held for municipal executive which will elect 5 women from the elected ward members and 3 members who must be from the Dalit and minority community. The electorate for this election will the 159 members chosen direct election.

Background
Elections were last held in 2006 and since then the city has been without an elected executive. With the passing of a new constitution, a commission was formed to restructure the existing local levels into more powerful and autonomous local bodies. The city limits of Kathmandu remained unchanged during this restructuring but the number of wards was decreased from 35 to 32. Electors in each ward will elect a ward chairman and 4 ward members. Out of 4 ward members, 2 must be female and one of the 2 females must belong to the Dalit community.

Issues
 Pollution
 Transport Infrastructure
 Urban Planning & Development
 Earthquake Reconstruction

Candidates for Mayoral Election

Bidya Sundar Shakya

Shakya is a former ward chairman and will be supported by Rastriya Prajatantra Party in exchange for support to the Deputy-mayor candidate Rajaram Shrestha. Shakya is the current secretary of CPN-UML's Kathmandu District Committee. He won the ward chairperson post in then Ward No. 21 in 1992 and 1997 local elections. Remarks to his work ethics, He is believed to be one of the most corrupted politician. He have also been widely criticized for his disregards to health care workers during covid and one of the laziest mayor assigned in the history of Kathmandu. After his term ended, the citizens of Nepal united to chant the change of "Never Again".

Sarbottam Dangol

Sarbottam Dangol is a former student leader who was detained for two years without charge or trial in 1985, including two months of incommunicado detention. He took part in Constituent Assembly Election, 2008 as a candidate from Kathmandu Constituency no. 8 and became third with 6,573 votes.

Kishor Thapa

Thapa is a former civil servant who retired from the post of Secretary. He is currently standing as an independent candidate but is associated with Sajha Party Nepal founded by former BBC reporter Rabindra Mishra.

Ranju Neupane (Ranju Darsana)

Neupane is a central committee member and media coordinator of Bibeksheel Nepali party. She was elected as central member by first general convention of the party in late 2015.

Mayoral Results

|-
! colspan="2" style="text-align:centre;" | Party
! style="width: 108pt;" |Candidate
! style="width: 40pt;" |Votes
! style="width: 30pt;" |%
|-
| style="background-color:;" |
| style="text-align:left;" |CPN (Unified Marxist–Leninist)
| style="text-align:left;"|Bidya Sundar Shakya
| 64,913
| 32.91
|-
| style="background-color:;" |
| style="text-align:left;" |Nepali Congress
| style="text-align:left;"|Raju Raj Joshi
| 45,269
| 22.95
|-
| style="background-color:yellow;" |
| style="text-align:left;" | Bibeksheel Nepali
| style="text-align:left;"| Ranju Darshana
| 23,439
| 11.88
|-
| style="background-color:;" |
| style="text-align:left;" | Independent
| style="text-align:left;"| Kishore Thapa 
| 18,496
| 9.38
|-
| style="background-color:darkred;" |
| style="text-align:left;" |Communist Party of Nepal (Maoist Centre)
| style="text-align:left;"| Sarbottam Dangol
| 7,906
| 4.01
|-
| style="background-color:crimson;" |
| style="text-align:left;" |Naya Shakti
| style="text-align:left;"|Pabitra Bajracharya
| 6,050
| 3.07
|-
|  |
| style="text-align:left;" |Others
| style="text-align:left;"|
| 1,213
| 0.62
|-
|- 
!colspan=3 align=left|Invalid/blank votes|| 29,941 || 15.18
|-
!colspan=3 align=left|Total|| 197,227|| 100
|- 
! colspan=3 align=left|Registered voters/turnout|| 271,221 || 72.72
|}

|-
! colspan="2" style="text-align:centre;" | Party
! style="width: 108pt;" |Candidate
! style="width: 40pt;" |Votes
! style="width: 30pt;" |%
|-
| style="background-color:;" |
| style="text-align:left;" |Nepali Congress
| style="text-align:left;"|Hari Prabha Khadgi
| 58,952
| 29.89
|-
| style="background-color:gold;" |
| style="text-align:left;" | Rastriya Prajatantra Party
| style="text-align:left;"| Raja Ram Shrestha
| 34,854
| 17.67
|-
| style="background-color:;" |
| style="text-align:left;" | Independent
| style="text-align:left;"| Nirupama Yadav
| 11,533
| 5.85
|-
| style="background-color:darkred;" |
| style="text-align:left;" |Communist Party of Nepal (Maoist Centre)
| style="text-align:left;"| Sushila Kumari Poudel
| 10,448
| 5.30
|-
| style="background-color:crimson;" |
| style="text-align:left;" |Naya Shakti
| style="text-align:left;"|Sabina Aryal (Dawadi)
| 3,493
| 1.77
|-
|  |
| style="text-align:left;" |Others
| style="text-align:left;"|
| 1,483
| 0.75
|-
|- 
!colspan=3 align=left|Invalid/blank votes|| 76,464 || 38.77
|- 
!colspan=3 align=left|Total|| 197,227|| 100
|- 
! colspan=3 align=left|Registered voters/turnout|| 271,221 || 72.72
|}

Ward Results

|-
! colspan="2" style="text-align:centre;" | Party
! Chairman
! Members
|-
| style="background-color:;" |
| style="text-align:left;" |CPN (Unified Marxist–Leninist)
| style="text-align:center;" | 18
| style="text-align:center;" | 74
|-
| style="background-color:;" |
| style="text-align:left;" |Nepali Congress
| style="text-align:center;" | 14
| style="text-align:center;" | 50
|-
| style="background-color:gold;" |
| style="text-align:left;" |Rastriya Prajatantra Party
| style="text-align:center;" | 0
| style="text-align:center;" | 1
|-
! colspan="2" style="text-align:right;" | Total
! 32
! 125
|}

3 candidates (2 from Nepali Congress and 1 from CPN-UML) for Ward Members were elected unopposed under Dalit woman reserved seats. 
3 Ward Member seats reserved for Dalit women were left unfilled due to lack of candidates.

Results by ward

See also 

 2017 Nepalese local elections
 1953 Kathmandu municipal election
 2017 Lalitpur municipal election

References

History of Kathmandu
2017
2017 elections in Nepal